The Midwest Pipe Band Association is an association of pipe bands in the Midwestern United States. Within its area of jurisdiction, the association includes over forty pipe bands, offers band, solo piping and drumming, and drum major competitions with sanctioned judges, and is responsible for overseeing seasonal competition among its member bands.

Individual members of the MWPBA compete in solo piping or snare drumming competitions ranging from novice to professional grades, as novice, intermediate, or advanced tenor drummers, novice or advanced bass drummers, or as drum majors. MWPBA member bands range from grade two to grade five, and are eligible to compete at sanctioned Highland Games throughout the season. At the end of each season, the association is responsible for regrading solo  members and bands according to their results, and for announcing the 'Champion Supreme' overall winners of each band, solo piping, and drumming grade.

See also
Pipe Band Association
List of pipe band associations

References

External links
 Official site

Pipe band associations
Music organizations based in the United States